Lampros Choutos (sometimes Lambros; born 7 December 1979) is a Greek former professional footballer who played as a striker.

During his career, he played equal periods of time in his country and Italy.

Club career

Early years
Born in Athens, Choutos started his career with Asteras Polygonou, being discovered by scouts of Panathinaikos FC. After only two years, he moved to Italy to finish his football grooming with A.S. Roma.

Professionals
Choutos' first stop as a senior was back in his country, loaned by Roma to Olympiacos F.C. after stellar performances during the qualifying stages for the 2000 UEFA European Under-21 Championship, as he netted 15 goals in only ten matches. He gradually made his way into the first team under the direction of Alberto Bigon, forming a productive attacking trio with Slovenia's Zlatko Zahovič and Giovanni from Brazil.

Although he suffered from an injured knee, Choutos managed to score decisive goals. He helped the Piraeus club win the 2000, 2001 and 2003 Superleague championships before returning to Italy, with Inter Milan.

Choutos signed a three-year contract with Inter in summer 2004, but could never settle there, being constantly loaned to other minor sides in both the country and abroad (Spain's RCD Mallorca, where he quickly fell out of favour with manager Héctor Cúper). He made his competitive debut for the Nerazzurri on 9 November 2006, coming on as a 78th-minute substitute for Mariano González in a Coppa Italia clash against F.C. Messina Peloro, which took place more than two years after his arrival; he left at the end of the campaign.

Choutos returned to his country in the 2007 off-season after signing with Panionios FC, but was only eligible to start playing in the following January. He again began experiencing first-team football, and notably scored two of three at Athens Olympic Sports Complex to help defeat hosts AEK Athens F.C. and collect the Man of the match award; he finished his half season with 12 goals, as his team finished in sixth position and participated in the second stage.

Choutos started his second year in scoring fashion, netting twice against OFK Beograd in the UEFA Intertoto Cup (3–1 home win, 3–2 on aggregate). After a run-in with the club's assistant coach that supposedly turned physical, however, the player was forced to leave.

On 2 February 2009, Choutos signed a six-month contract with PAOK FC, appearing in eight scoreless matches. On 25 August he returned to Italy once again, joining lowly A.S. Pescina Valle del Giovenco for two years; his contract was cancelled in July 2010, after the club was excluded from the Italian football league system due to financial issues.

International career
Courtesy of his solid under-21 performances, Choutos soon made his debut for the Greek full side, going on to win ten caps in four years. He was overlooked for the squads that appeared at both UEFA Euro 2004 and 2008.

Personal life
Choutos origin is from the village Agioi Thedoroi, Trikala.

Honours
Olympiacos
Superleague Greece: 1999–2000, 2000–01, 2002–03

Inter
Serie A: 2006–07
Coppa Italia: 2004–05

References

External links

1979 births
Living people
Footballers from Athens
Greek footballers
Association football forwards
Serie A players
Serie C players
A.S. Roma players
Inter Milan players
Atalanta B.C. players
Reggina 1914 players
Super League Greece players
Olympiacos F.C. players
Panionios F.C. players
PAOK FC players
La Liga players
RCD Mallorca players
Greece under-21 international footballers
Greece international footballers
Greek expatriate footballers
Expatriate footballers in Italy
Expatriate footballers in Spain
Survivor Greece contestants
Greek expatriate sportspeople in Italy
Greek expatriate sportspeople in Spain